David McNicol may refer to:

David McNicol (diplomat) (1913–2001), Australian diplomat
David McNicol (politician) (1833–?), Canadian politician